Orlovsky (masculine), Orlovskaya (feminine), or Orlovskoye (neuter) is the name of several inhabited localities in Russia.

Modern localities
Urban localities
Orlovsky, Zabaykalsky Krai, an urban-type settlement in Aginsky District of Zabaykalsky Krai

Rural localities
Orlovsky, Kemerovo Oblast, a settlement in Shabanovskaya Rural Territory of Leninsk-Kuznetsky District of Kemerovo Oblast
Orlovsky, Nizhny Novgorod Oblast, a settlement in Ostankinsky Selsoviet under the administrative jurisdiction of the town of Bor, Nizhny Novgorod Oblast
Orlovsky, Chulymsky District, Novosibirsk Oblast, a settlement in Chulymsky District of Novosibirsk Oblast
Orlovsky, Kolyvansky District, Novosibirsk Oblast, a settlement in Kolyvansky District of Novosibirsk Oblast
Orlovsky, Rostov Oblast, a settlement in Orlovskoye Rural Settlement of Orlovsky District of Rostov Oblast
Orlovsky, Ryazan Oblast, a settlement in Orlovsky Rural Okrug of Pronsky District of Ryazan Oblast
Orlovsky, Seltinsky District, Udmurt Republic, a vyselok in Novomonyinsky Selsoviet of Seltinsky District of the Udmurt Republic
Orlovsky, Yarsky District, Udmurt Republic, a pochinok in Pudemsky Selsoviet of Yarsky District of the Udmurt Republic
Orlovsky, Novonikolayevsky District, Volgograd Oblast, a khutor under the administrative jurisdiction of the urban-type settlement of Novonikolayevsky of Novonikolayevsky District of Volgograd Oblast
Orlovskoye, Novosibirsk Oblast, a selo in Ubinsky District of Novosibirsk Oblast
Orlovskoye, Saratov Oblast, a selo in Marksovsky District of Saratov Oblast
Orlovskoye, Udmurt Republic, a selo in Orlovsky Selsoviet of Syumsinsky District of the Udmurt Republic
Orlovskoye, Yaroslavl Oblast, a village in Mikhaylovsky Rural Okrug of Rybinsky District of Yaroslavl Oblast
Orlovskaya (rural locality), a village in Dvinitsky Selsoviet of Syamzhensky District of Vologda Oblast

Abolished localities
Orlovsky, Serafimovichsky District, Volgograd Oblast, a khutor in Kletsko-Pochtovsky Selsoviet of Serafimovichsky District of Volgograd Oblast; abolished before July 2013